5F can refer to:

 5f electrons; see Electron configuration
 5-F-AMT, abbreviation for 5-Fluoro-AMT
 5F, the production code for the 1979 Doctor Who serial The Armageddon Factor\
 IATA code for Arctic Circle Air

See also
F5 (disambiguation)